Events in the year 2021 in Hungary.

Incumbents
President: János Áder
Prime Minister: Viktor Orbán
Speaker of the National Assembly: László Kövér

Events

February 

 14 February – Klubrádió ceases operation on 92.9 FM.

March 

 3 March – Fidesz leaves the European People's Party group after the EPP Group's new rules.

April 

 1 April – The Polish Prime Minister Mateusz Morawiecki, and Italian former Minister of the Interior and leader of Northern League Matteo Salvini visit Hungary to meet with Hungarian Prime Minister: Viktor Orbán. It was wildly reported by the media they talked about forming a New Nationalist Conservative political group of the European Parliament to counter European People's Party group.

June 
 5 June - an estimated 10,000 protest against Hungary's plan to build Chinese Fudan University campus with Chinese loans.
 10 June - The Hungarian government announces proposes a new law banning the 'promotion' of homosexuality and gender change to children under 18 in schools, films or books.
 15 June - The Hungarian parliament passes a new law that bans the 'promotion' of homosexuality and gender change to children in schools, films or books. Some people say its similar to The Russian gay propaganda law passed in Russia in 2013. 
Ongoing — COVID-19 pandemic in Hungary

September 
5 to 12 September – the 2021 International Eucharistic Congress takes place in Budapest. Pope Francis meets with Hungarian prime minister Viktor Orban.
 23 September – The 4th Budapest Demographic Summit is held. Former US vice president (2017-2021) Mike Pence, Serbian President Aleksandar Vucic, Bosnian Serb leader Milorad Dodik, Slovenian Prime Minister Janez Jansa and Czech Prime Minister Andrej Babis all attend the summit.

Scheduled events

Deaths

 
 

5 January – András Haán, Olympic basketball player and sailor (born 1946).
18 January – Ákos Kriza, health economist and politician (born 1965).
30 January – József Csatári, wrestler (born 1943).
3 February – Albán Vermes, swimmer (born 1957).
1 May – József Hámori, biologist and politician (born 1932).
3 May – András Gergely, historian and diplomat (born 1946).
7 May – Pál Gömöry, competitive sailor (born 1936).
3 June – Alajos Dornbach, politician and lawyer (born 1936).
16 July – Thomas Rajna, pianist and composer  (Seven Years in Tibet, Jet Storm) (b. 1928).
28 July – István Csom, chess Grandmaster (born 1940).

See also
List of Hungarian films since 1990

References

 
2020s in Hungary
Years of the 21st century in Hungary
Hungary
Hungary